René Alphonse van den Berghe (Nivelles, 1940 – 19 June 2020), known as Erik the Belgian (Erik el Belga) in Spain, was a Belgian art dealer implicated in the theft to order of a large number of artworks from Spanish churches. Although Erik was imprisoned several times, ultimately in Spain for 37 months, the Spanish courts failed to convict him of any art theft. Van den Berghe was a self-proclaimed thief, stating: "I’m no small-time crook. I’m a high-class thief. I have stolen for the love of art and I have stolen luxury items. Money has no luxury value." 

On November 7, 1980, van den Berghe stole six Flemish tapestries from a church in the town of Castrojeriz. These tapestries were made in Bruges by Corneille Schutz in 1654. While the tapestries were recovered by an Interpol-led investigation, a section of the La apoteosis de las artes (The Apotheosis of the Arts) was only recently discovered in February 2022. The fragment was returned to the archdiocese of Burgos on February 18, 2022.

References

Belgian art dealers
Belgian expatriates in Spain
People from Nivelles
Place of death missing
1940 births
2020 deaths